Spel (released February 9, 2004 on the Heilo catalog at the Grappa label – HCD 7188) is a live recording and the fifth album from the Norwegian folk band Bukkene Bruse.

Review 
Bukkene Bruse, alone and in creative interaction, creates new Norwegian folk music, yet traditional, with the album Spel. This likable traditional folk band comes up with a live recording of their most famous songs. All in new arrangements together with new material. The sound is good, and in addition the musicians are performing some solo tunes in a convincing manner. This time they also performe with the Norwegian string quartet Vertavo, that gives the album an extra energy.

Track listing
«Folketone Fra Sunnmøre» (4:19)
«En Enda Villere Vinter» (4:10)
«Syng I Stille Morgonstunder» (3:24) Trilogi
«Bruremarsj Fra Østerdalen» (3:05)
«Norafjølls» (6:51)
«Stev» (4:35)
«Fanitullen Goes To America» (4:53) Solospel
«Tannlausen / Vil Du Koma Til Rinden» (3:44)
«Nystev Og Gamlestev» (3:06)
«Bømarislåtten» (3:53)
«Ein Annan Halling» (3:32)
«St. Sunniva» (3:33)
«Haslebuskane» (2:37)
«Maria, Hun Er En Jomfru Reen» (3:03)
«Mit Hjerte Altid Vanker» (6:26)

Personnel 
Arve Moen Bergset - vocals, violin & Hardingfele
Annbjørg Lien - Hardingfele & nyckelharpa
Steinar Ofsdal - flute
Bjørn Ole Rasch - pipe organ

Vertavo String Quartet
Øyvor Volle - violin
Annabelle Meare - violin
Berit Cardas - viola
Bjørg Lewis - cello

References

External links

Live albums by Norwegian artists
2004 live albums
Live folk albums
Bukkene Bruse albums